Chavdar Peninsula is a 10-km wide peninsula projecting 13 km in northwest direction from Graham Land on the Antarctic Peninsula in Antarctica.  It is bounded by Curtiss Bay to the northeast, Hughes Bay to the southwest and Gerlache Strait to the northwest.  Its west extremity Cape Sterneck separates Danco Coast to the southwest and Davis Coast to the northeast. The interior of the peninsula is partly occupied by the westerly portion of Kaliva Range.

The feature is named for the 16th-century Bulgarian rebel leader Chavdar Voyvoda.

Location

British mapping in 1978.

Maps
 British Antarctic Territory.  Scale 1:200000 topographic map No. 3198. DOS 610 – W 64 60.  Tolworth, UK, 1978.
 Antarctic Digital Database (ADD). Scale 1:250000 topographic map of Antarctica. Scientific Committee on Antarctic Research (SCAR), 1993–2016.

Notes

References
 Bulgarian Antarctic Gazetteer. Antarctic Place-names Commission. (details in Bulgarian, basic data in English)
 Chavdar Peninsula. SCAR Composite Antarctic Gazetteer

External links
 Chavdar Peninsula. Copernix satellite image

Peninsulas of Graham Land
Bulgaria and the Antarctic
Danco Coast
Davis Coast